A Question may refer to:

 A Question (album), a 1991 album by Sacred Reich
 A Question (poem), a poem by Robert Frost